Anas Mahmood (born 16 March 1990) is a Pakistani cricketer who plays for Lahore. He made his first-class debut on 26 October 2015 in the 2015–16 Quaid-e-Azam Trophy.

References

External links
 

1990 births
Living people
Pakistani cricketers
Lahore cricketers
Cricketers from Karachi